National Highway 124D, commonly referred to as NH 124D is a national highway in India. It is a secondary route of National Highway 24.  NH-124D runs in the state of Uttar Pradesh in India.

Route 
NH124D connects Mardah, Jakhania, Sadat and Saidpur in the state of Uttar Pradesh.

Junctions  

  Terminal near Mardah.
  Terminal near Saidpur.

See also 
 List of National Highways in India
 List of National Highways in India by state

References

External links 

 NH 124D on OpenStreetMap

National highways in India
National Highways in Uttar Pradesh